Koob is a surname. Notable people with the surname include:

Ernie Koob (1892–1941), American baseball player
George Koob (born 1947), American academic
Markus Koob (born 1977), German politician
Richard Koob (born 1946), American artist

See also
Kubb